The Lazatin House is one of the two heritage houses owned by the Lazatin family in the City of San Fernando, Pampanga province in the Philippines.

History
The house was built in 1925 by the couple Serafin Lazatin y Ocampo, president of the San Fernando Electric Light & Power Company (SFELAPCO), and Encarnacion Singian y Torres.  During the Second World War, it was appropriated by the Japanese Imperial Army to serve as a residence of its 14th Army Commander, General Masaharu Homma, in San Fernando, Pampanga. It has a Ghost-Story within this house.

Heritage House
This ancestral house, which exemplifies the type of Bahay na Bato architecture prevalent during the American colonial period was declared a Heritage House by the National Historical Institute on January 27, 2003 by virtue of Resolution No. 6, S. 2003. Presently, this ancestral house and majority of SFELAPCO is still owned by the surviving members of the Lazatin family.

Buildings and structures in San Fernando, Pampanga
Landmarks in the Philippines
Heritage Houses in the Philippines